The Arts District is a performing and visual arts district in downtown Dallas, Texas.

It is located south of State Thomas; southeast of Uptown; north of the City Center District; west of Bryan Place; and east of the West End Historic District.  It is bounded by St. Paul Street, Ross Avenue, Spur 366 (Woodall Rodgers Freeway), and the US 75/I-45 (unsigned I-345) elevated freeway (Central Expressway).  (Previously the district extended east only to Routh Street, but a 9 March 2005 Dallas City Council approval extended it east to I-345.) The Arts District is a member of the Global Cultural Districts Network.

The district is 118 acres (0.47 km²) large and is home to some of Dallas’ most significant cultural landmarks including facilities for visual, performing, and developing arts.

Arts District venues 

The Arts District is home to 18 facilities and organizations including The Annette Strauss Square, the Arts District Mansion/Dallas Bar Association, Booker T. Washington High School for the Performing and Visual Arts, Cathedral Shrine of the Virgin of Guadalupe, Dallas Black Dance Theatre, Dallas Museum of Art, Dallas Symphony Orchestra, Dallas Theater Center, Morton H. Meyerson Symphony Center, Nasher Sculpture Center, St. Paul United Methodist Church, Fellowship Church, First United Methodist Church, Margot & Bill Winspear Opera House, Dee and Charles Wyly Theater, Moody Performance Hall, the Green Family Art Foundation, and the Crow Museum of Asian Art, housed in a portion of the Trammell Crow Center.

In addition, multiple other organizations perform in the District on an ongoing basis. This includes everything from concerts to outdoor festivals, to lectures, youth education programs, and more.

 AT&T Performing Arts Center
Annette Strauss Square
 Dee and Charles Wyly Theatre
 Margot and Bill Winspear Opera House
 Moody Performance Hall
 Booker T. Washington High School for the Performing and Visual Arts
 Crow Museum of Asian Art
 Dallas Museum of Art
 Morton H. Meyerson Symphony Center
 Nasher Sculpture Center
 Klyde Warren Park

Other structures 

 Arts District Mansion / Dallas Bar Association
 Cathedral Santuario de Guadalupe
 Dallas Black Dance Theatre (formerly the Moorland YMCA)
 Fellowship Church (Downtown Campus)
 Trammell Crow Center
 Klyde Warren Park
 St. Paul United Methodist Church

Transportation

Trains

Light rail 
 St. Paul Station (in City Center District)
 Pearl Station (in City Center District)

Streetcars 
 McKinney Avenue Transit Authority M-Line runs from McKinney Avenue south down St. Paul Street to Federal Street, east along Federal to Olive Street, and north on Olive back up to McKinney.

Highways 
  Spur 366 (Woodall Rodgers Freeway)
  US 75 Central Expressway/ I-45 connection (unsigned  I-345)

Education 

The Arts District is served by the Dallas Independent School District.

One school, the Booker T. Washington High School for the Performing and Visual Arts, is located in the Arts District.

Residents of the Arts District north and east of Akard Street are zoned to Sam Houston Elementary School. Residents south and west of Akard are zoned to Hope Medrano Elementary School. All Arts District residents are zoned to Thomas J. Rusk Middle School and North Dallas High School.

References

External links

Dallas Arts District
City of Dallas Planned Development (PD) district documents — Arts District
AT&T Center for the Performing Arts
Moody Performance Hall
Booker T. Washington High School for the Performing and Visual Arts
Booker T. Washington High School for the Performing and Visual Arts Advisory Board
Dallas Museum of Art
Morton H. Meyerson Symphony Center
Nasher Sculpture Center
Klyde Warren Park

Arts in Dallas
Arts districts
Downtown Dallas